Saint Germanicus was a youth who was arrested and martyred for his faith in Smyrna  during the reign of the Roman Emperor Antoninus. As Germanicus stood in the arena, facing a wild beast, the Roman proconsul pleaded with him that in view of his youth he should deny his faith to obtain a pardon. But the young man refused to apostatize, and willingly embraced martyrdom.

Germanicus was praised for his courage facing the wild beasts used to kill him, and was referenced in the Martyrdom of Polycarp.

References

Saints from Roman Anatolia
2nd-century Christian martyrs
155 deaths
Year of birth unknown